Ilya Vladimirovich Martynov (born 25 January 2000) is a Russian football player. He plays for FC Rotor Volgograd.

Club career
He made his debut in the Russian Professional Football League for FC Krasnodar-2 on 16 May 2018 in a game against FC Afips Afipsky. He made his Russian Football National League debut for Krasnodar-2 on 22 July 2018 in a game against FC SKA-Khabarovsk.

He made his Russian Premier League debut for FC Tambov on 10 April 2021 against FC Khimki.

On 10 June 2021, he joined FC Rotor Volgograd on loan.

References

External links
 
 

2000 births
Sportspeople from Rostov-on-Don
Living people
Russian footballers
Russia youth international footballers
Association football defenders
FC Krasnodar players
FC Krasnodar-2 players
FC Tambov players
FC Rotor Volgograd players
Russian Premier League players
Russian First League players
Russian Second League players